A Polish Paraguayan is a Paraguayan-born person of full or partial Polish ancestry or a Polish-born citizen who resides in Paraguay. The peak of Polish immigration to Paraguay began during the 20th century, particularly after World War II when millions of Poles left their country and chose different countries where they could find a better quality of life. In South America, Paraguay was one of the main destinations.

Polish immigration to Paraguay 
Along its history, Paraguay has been home to many immigrants from around the world (especially after the Paraguayan War), mainly from Europe and the Middle East, being settled by different immigrant groups, including Poles, although not as much as were its neighbours like Argentina or Brazil. The first Poles arrived in Paraguay in 30 years-blooded and therefore even before World War II. In these years, Paraguay and most of all Itapúa region, near the border with Argentina, received large waves of Polish, Russian, and Ukrainian immigrants. They established colonies such as Fram, which is situated north-west of the city of Encarnación, the capital of Itapúa, which lies opposite Posadas, Misiones in Argentina.

From 1927 to 1938, there was an exodus from Poland to Paraguay of more than 10,000 people. About 12,000 Poles emigrated to Paraguay, 60 of whom over the same period returned to their country. However, a new amount of 12,000 immigrants arrived although there were 2,200 Poles among them only; the rest were mostly Ukrainians (majority) and Belarusians.

Part of the Poles arrived in Paraguay came from the Polish colony of Brazil, who moved from the regions of Santa Catarina and Rio Grande do Sul to Paraguay or Argentina. Other Poles arrived from Argentina. In 1930 a large group of German Mennonites from Poland settled in the colony Fernheim. It is estimated that in 1939 in Paraguay lived approx. 17,000 Poles and Polish citizens.

In the 1930s the Ministry of Foreign Affairs of Poland elaborated a plan of establishing a Polish colony in the triangle between Brazil, Paraguay and Argentina. The emigration to this area was officially supported, the government even bought some terrains in the region and initiated two Polish settlements. These ideas collapsed with the independence of Brazil and World War II.

See also 
 Immigration to Paraguay
 Ukrainians in Paraguay

References 

European Paraguayan
Immigration to Paraguay

Paraguay
Paraguay